Smash His Camera is a 2010 documentary film directed by filmmaker Leon Gast about the life and career of paparazzi photographer Ron Galella. The film won the "Directing Award Documentary" at the 2010 Sundance Film Festival and was released on 30 July 2010 through Magnolia Pictures, and was shown on HBO.

References

External links

Noel Murray, The AV Club (July 29, 2010)
Smash His Camera at HBO

2010 films
2010 documentary films
American documentary films
Documentary films about photographers
Films directed by Leon Gast
2010s English-language films
2010s American films